Vivek Vaswani is an actor, writer and producer. He is also dean of Pearl Academy

Career 

An alumnus of Campion School and Cathedral and John Connon, started off with acting in India's first TV soap opera 'Khandaan'. He then produced a Marathi film called 'Kis Bai Kiss', and a major television serial called 'Nai Dishayen', in which he also starred along with Navin Nischol, Anju Mahendroo, Girish Karnad, Parikshat Sahni, Sharon prabhakar, Jayant Kripalani. He produced 'Gawaahi', giving a break to Anant Balani as a director. The film starred Zeenat Aman, Tanuja, Vikram Gokhale, and both India's Oscar nominated directors, Shekhar Kapur and Ashutosh Gowariker. He then produced three films at Sippy Films, alongside GP Sippy, 'Patthar Ke Phool', 'Raju Ban Gaya Gentleman', 'Aatish' and played minor roles in them as well. He has launched Raveena Tandon, Shah Rukh Khan, and given breaks to many (Sanjay Gupta and Sanjay Gadhvi were both assisting on 'Patthar ke Phool).

He has acted in more than a 100 films.

When Shah Rukh Khan came to Mumbai as a hopeful actor, he had no place to stay. He lived with Vaswani, who later appeared in Raju Ban Gaya Gentleman and Josh with him, and helped SRK meet directors and producers. and launched him in 'Raju Ban Gaya Gentleman'. they also acted together in 'English Babu Desi Mem', 'Dulha Mil Gaya', 'Kabhi Haan Kabhi Naa', 'King Uncle' and Vaswani has been a continuous mentor to him.

Vaswani also produced 'Everybody say's I'm Fine' in the English language, giving a break to Rahul Bose, who made his debut as a director, actors Koel Purie, Rehaan Engineer, Anahita Uberoi, Boman Irani, and has the distinction of getting Carlos Santana to play lead guitar on the title track of the film, composed by Zakir Hussain.

Films 
Vivek Vaswani's first film as a producer was a Marathi film titled "Kis Bai Kiss" which was made in eleven lakhs. The film was directed by Murlidhar Kapdi in 1986. The film starred actors Laxmikant Berde, Ashwini Bhave, Avinash Kharshikar, Nivedita Joshi, Nayantara and Sudhir Joshi.
 
As an actor, he has played minor roles in various films, starting with Patthar Ke Phool in 1991. Vivek played a character named Lovechand Kukreja in the superhit film Raju Ban Gaya Gentleman (1992), starring Shahrukh Khan.  The actor also appeared in hit films like Jab Pyaar Kisise Hota Hai, Soldier, Aa Ab Laut Chalen (1999), Tera Jadoo Chal Gayaa, Josh (2000), Maine Pyaar Kyun Kiya (2005), My Name Is Anthony Gonsalves (2008) and more. On Television, his famous series was Kabhi yeh Kabhi Voh, with Smita Jaykar, Jatin Kanakia and Dilip Joshi. He also acted in Zabaan Sambhalke, with Pankaj Kapoor.

Filmography 

 As actor

 Dulha Mil Gaya ... Lawyer
 My Name is Anthony Gonsalves
 Shakalaka Boom Boom ... Vidyacharan Shukla
 36 China Town ... Mr. Dixit, Lawyer
 Aashiq Banaya Aapne ... Karan's Uncle
 Barsaat ... Mr. Vaswani
 Insan ... Agarwal
 Fida ... The Bank Employee
 Ishq Vishk ... Professor
 Hum Kisise Kum Nahin ... Doctor
 Josh ... Savio
 Tera Jadoo Chal Gayaa
 Aa Ab Laut Chalen ... Vaswani
 Jab Pyaar Kisise Hota Hai ... Suraj Dhanwa
 Raju Ban Gaya Gentleman ... Lovechand
 Soldier ... The College Principal
 Aashiq Awara ... Rakesh Rajpal
 King Uncle ... Kamal
 Khandaan
 Mastizaade ... Producer
 Bullets

 As producer and writer

 Kis Bai Kis  (1986)  Marathi Film
 Nai Dishayen (TV)
 Gawaahi (1986) Feature
 Patthar ke Phool (co produced with Sippy Films)
 Raju ban Gaya gentleman (co produced with Sippy Films)
 Everybody Says I'm Fine
 Sar Aankhon Par
 Dil Vil Pyar Vyar (co produced with Metalight)
 Dulha Mil Gaya
 Rough Book (co produced with Aerika Cineworks)

References

External links

 Vivek Vaswani Filmography Bollywood Hungama

1972 births
Male actors in Hindi cinema
Hindi-language film directors
Indian costume designers
Indian male film actors
Film directors from Mumbai
Film producers from Mumbai
Indian television talk show hosts
Living people
Male actors from Mumbai
Punjabi people
Sindhi people
20th-century Indian male actors
21st-century Indian male actors